Nariman Gasimoglu is the Director of the Center for Religion and Democracy, a human rights organization based in Baku, Azerbaijan that promotes interfaith cooperation.

Gasimoglu is a Georgetown University visiting scholar. He has also translated Quran into Azerbaijan language.

References

Azerbaijani Shia Muslims
Azerbaijani human rights activists
Living people
Year of birth missing (living people)